Mathew Maione (born November 21, 1990) is a Canadian ice hockey defenceman playing for Bietigheim Steelers of the Deutsche Eishockey Liga (DEL).

Playing career
Born in Toronto, Ontario, Maione joined the Niagara IceDogs of the Ontario Hockey League beginning in the 2007–08 season. After two seasons with the IceDogs, he was traded to Guelph Storm during the 2009–10 offseason in exchange for a 10th round pick in the 2011 OHL Draft. After finishing the 2009–10 season with the Storm, he attended the University of Prince Edward Island for four years while majoring in psychology and biology. After earning his degree, Maione signed with the Fort Wayne Komets in the ECHL. He re-signed with the Komets on July 1, 2014.

On October 29, 2014, he signed with the Brampton Beast. He played one season with the team before being traded to the Wheeling Nailers on December 2, 2015, in exchange for future considerations. After finishing the season leading all ECHL defensemen with  43 assists, 54 points, 21 power-play assists, 24 power-play points and 227 shots on goal he was named to the All-ECHL First Team and ECHL Defenseman of the Year.

After playing in the ECHL for three seasons, Maione moved overseas to play with HC '05 Banská Bystrica in Slovakia. Following the 2016–17 season, he then moved to Finland to play with KalPa in the Finnish Liiga. After one season, he joined Dinamo Riga in the Kontinental Hockey League (KHL). Maione enjoyed a successful debut in the KHL with Riga in the 2018–19 season. He was named to the All-Star Game and led all Dinamo defenseman in scoring with 46 points in 58 games.

On May 8, 2019, he signed an improved contract to continue in the KHL, agreeing to terms on a one-year deal with Chinese entrant, Kunlun Red Star.

References

External links

1990 births
Living people
Canadian ice hockey defencemen
HC '05 Banská Bystrica players
SC Bietigheim-Bissingen players
Bolzano HC players
Brampton Beast players
Dinamo Riga players
HC Dinamo Minsk players
Fort Wayne Komets players
Guelph Storm players
KalPa players
HC Kunlun Red Star players
EHC München players
Niagara IceDogs players
Ice hockey people from Toronto
UPEI Panthers ice hockey players
Universiade gold medalists for Canada
Universiade medalists in ice hockey
Competitors at the 2013 Winter Universiade
Wheeling Nailers players
Canadian sportspeople of Italian descent
Canadian expatriate ice hockey players in the United States
Canadian expatriate ice hockey players in Slovakia
Canadian expatriate ice hockey players in Finland
Canadian expatriate ice hockey players in Latvia
Canadian expatriate ice hockey players in China
Canadian expatriate ice hockey players in Belarus
Canadian expatriate ice hockey players in Germany
Canadian expatriate ice hockey players in Italy